Opelt is a surname. Notable people with the surname include:

Friedrich Wilhelm Opelt (1794–1863), German musicologist, mathematician, and astronomer
Ulrich Opelt, German canoeist

See also
Opelt (crater), a lunar impact crater on the Mare Nubium (Moon)
Oppelt